School's Out Forever is a 2021 British horror-comedy film based on the novel School's Out by Scott K. Andrews. It was written and directed by Oliver Milburn and starred Oscar Kennedy, Anthony Head, Alex Macqueen and Samantha Bond. It was released on 15 February 2021.

Synopsis
The film revolved around a group of teachers and students of a private boys' school sheltering from a global pandemic.

Reception
On the review aggregator website Rotten Tomatoes, the film has an approval rating of 73%, based on 15 reviews, with an average rating of 5/10.

References

External links
 

2021 films
2020s English-language films